This is a compilation of published detonation velocities for various high explosive compounds. Detonation velocity is the speed with which the detonation shock wave travels through the explosive. It is a key, directly measurable indicator of explosive performance, but depends on density which must always be specified, and may be too low if the test charge diameter is not large enough. Especially for little studied explosives there may be divergent published values due to charge diameter issues. In liquid explosives, like nitroglycerin, there may be two detonation velocities, one much higher than the other. The detonation velocity values presented here are typically for the highest practical density which maximizes achievable detonation velocity.

The velocity of detonation is an important indicator for overall energy and power of detonation, and in particular for the brisance or shattering effect of an explosive which is due to the detonation pressure. The pressure can be calculated using Chapman-Jouguet theory from the velocity and density.

See also
 TNT equivalent
 RE factor

References

Chemistry-related lists

Explosive chemicals